Ken B. Rasmussen (born 1966, Denmark) is an author, journalist and talk radio host. He wrote the number one bestseller :da:Livet, det Forbandede, a novel which became the catalyst for the 2014 Se og Hør media scandal.
He lived for many years in Los Angeles, USA, before returning to Denmark in 2005.

He is a columnist at BT and a talk radio host at :da:Radio24syv.

Bibliography
 Livet, det Forbandede (2014)
 Ond Jagt (2014)
 Blodigt Smil (2016)
 Flugt til Døden (2016)
 Når Mænd Hader (2016)
 Ove Verner Hansen – Ja Tak Til Livet (2016)
 Søn af Sandberg (2018)

1966 births
Danish journalists
Living people